PYR-41 is a cell permeable irreversible inhibitor of ubiquitin-activating enzyme E1.
It was also reported to increase sumoylation in cells.

PYR-41 also blocks the downstream ubiquitination and ubiquitination-dependent protein degradation or other ubiquitination-mediated cellular activities. In addition, PYR-41 inhibits degradation of p53, a tumour suppressor.

References

4-Aminobenzoate esters
Furans